Olga Zubova (born 9 December 1993) is a Russian weightlifter.

Career
After coming back from a 2 year suspension and not having been defeated for gold in any competition until the World Weightlifting Championships in Houston, USA 2015, this immensely talented athlete was the prime candidate to lead the Russian women's 75kg class for gold in the 2016 Olympics until she was suspended for drug violations once again.

She competed in the 2013 World Weightlifting Championships – Women's 75 kg convincing winning the Gold medal but then got disqualified for using a banned substance, Clomiphene, in competition that resulted in her 1st suspension

She returned to competition at the 2015 World Weightlifting Championships in Houston, Texas and took bronze in women's 75 kg, where she failed a doping control again.

In May 2016, Olga Zubova has been banned for eight years for doping.

Since being banned she has participated in the relative new sport CrossFit that stresses a combination of various athletic movements requiring great muscle endurance.
She purportedly had in training(while suspended) exceeded all world records in 75kg class with a snatch over 135 kg & clean&jerk 175 kg.

References

Russian female weightlifters
1993 births
Living people
Weightlifters at the 2010 Summer Youth Olympics
Doping cases in weightlifting
Russian sportspeople in doping cases
Universiade medalists in weightlifting
Universiade gold medalists for Russia
Youth Olympic gold medalists for Russia
European Weightlifting Championships medalists
World Weightlifting Championships medalists
Medalists at the 2013 Summer Universiade
20th-century Russian women
21st-century Russian women